Flor de María Vega Zapata is a Peruvian lawyer who has taken a stand against illegal mining and logging in her country. She was recognized with the International Women of Courage Award in 2019.

Life
Zapata studied law and graduated in 1984 from the Faculty of Jurisprudence and Political Sciences of the Universidad Nacional Federico Villarreal.

Zapata rose to be the National Coordinator for Peru's environmental prosecutors. She leads a team of Public Prosecutors who create cases to prosecute criminal organizations engaged in criminal enterprises of illegal mining and logging.

Activism
She is lawyer who came to notice when she took a stand against illegal mining logging in her country. There is a health rish from illegal gold mining in Peru. The illegal mining and logging funds criminal organisation who undermine the rule of law. Zapata and her team of prosecutors created 500 cases against illegal miners using the environmental enforcement interagency in 2016.

Although it was not until 2019 that the first successful case was brought. Her team has also seized illegal goods and they took $1.6m of timber in the largest ever seizure.

She was recognized as a Woman of Courage in 2019.

References 

Peruvian women lawyers
20th-century Peruvian lawyers
Peruvian human rights activists
Women human rights activists
Peruvian women activists
Living people
Year of birth missing (living people)
Recipients of the International Women of Courage Award
21st-century Peruvian lawyers